The production of beer in Tibet is a relatively recent phenomenon in Tibetan cuisine. The Chinese established the Lhasa Brewery Company in 1988, which is located in Lhasa. It is the highest brewery in the world.

History

The first historical record of beer in Tibet are Chinese, concerning a 638 peace agreement between Tang China and the new Tibetan kingdom of Songtsen Gampo include the technological transfers of silk, paper, watermill and beer production. Tang Taizong did not respect the agreement on these technical transfer, but his son, Tang Gaozong, did.

However, somewhat contradicting the fact that alcohol is contrary to the beliefs of Tibetan Buddhism, is the fact that for centuries, chhaang, a local brew of barley sold by glass at street stalls in Lhasa and across towns in Tibet has been consumed by many Tibetans and monks.

See also

 Beer and breweries by region
 Chhaang, a traditional Tibetan and Nepalese beer
 List of Tibetan dishes

References

Sources

External links
Official site (USA)
Lhasa Brewery Partners Website

Beer in China
Chinese alcoholic drinks
Tibetan cuisine